Lepturus pulchellus is a species of grass in the family Poaceae. It is found only in Yemen. Its natural habitat is subtropical or tropical dry shrubland.

References

pulchellus
Endemic flora of Socotra
Data deficient plants
Taxonomy articles created by Polbot
Taxa named by Isaac Bayley Balfour